Triacanthagyna septima, the pale green darner, is a species of dragonfly in the family Aeshnidae. It is found in southern Texas.

Description
The head of the male is olive and the eyes bluish-green. The thorax is pale green with a brownish wash on the front and the legs are pale. The abdomen is mostly brown, segments 1 and 2 having greenish sides and a slender greenish dorsal stripe. The female is very similar in coloration to the male but has greenish-brown eyes and has three long, slender cerci (appendages) on the last segment. These may break off in mature individuals which then closely resemble males.

References

Aeshnidae
Insects described in 1857